"Da Joint" (sometimes spelt "The Joint") is the first single from EPMD's fifth album, Back in Business. Produced by Erick Sermon and Rockwilder, "Da Joint" became EPMD's second and final single to make it to the Billboard Hot 100, peaking at 94 on the chart with approximately 100,000 copies sold in the first week. "Da Joint" was released a week before the Back in Business album, making it to the first release by the newly reformed EPMD since the group's 1992 single, "Head Banger".

Hype Williams was planning to shoot the music video for "Da Joint", but those plans never materialized. Instead, Steve Carr directed the music video.

Track listing
Side A
"Da Joint" (Radio Edit) – 3:26  
"Da Joint" (LP Version) – 3:27 
Side B
"Da Joint" (Instrumental) – 3:26  
"You Gots 2 Chill '97" (Radio Edit) – 3:27

Personnel
Credits are adapted from the single's liner notes.

 Erick Sermon – producer, writer
 Parrish Smith – producer, writer
 Tommy Uzzo – recording
 Ivan "Doc" Rodriguez – mixing
 Danny Clinch – photography

Charts

References

1997 singles
1997 songs
EPMD songs
Songs written by Erick Sermon
Songs written by Rockwilder
Songs written by PMD (rapper)
Songs written by James Brown
Def Jam Recordings singles